The 1986–87 Buffalo Sabres season was the 17th season for the National Hockey League franchise that was established on May 22, 1970.

Offseason

Regular season

Final standings

Schedule and results

Playoffs
The Sabres failed to qualify for the playoffs for the second consecutive year.

Player statistics

Awards and records

Transactions

Draft picks
Buffalo's draft picks at the 1986 NHL Entry Draft held at the Montreal Forum in Montreal, Quebec.

Farm teams

See also
1986–87 NHL season

References

Buffalo
Buffalo
Buffalo Sabres seasons
Buffalo
Buffalo